Wilson Theleso (born 25 June 1960) is a Botswanan long-distance runner. He competed in the marathon at the 1984 Summer Olympics.

References

External links
 

1960 births
Living people
Athletes (track and field) at the 1984 Summer Olympics
Botswana male long-distance runners
Botswana male marathon runners
Olympic athletes of Botswana
Athletes (track and field) at the 1982 Commonwealth Games
Athletes (track and field) at the 1990 Commonwealth Games
Commonwealth Games competitors for Botswana
World Athletics Championships athletes for Botswana
Place of birth missing (living people)